According to law No. 178/2020, the Lebanese government legalized the cultivation and trade, also medicinal use of cannabis, with respect to the stated regulations of the law. Only recreational use remains illegal. International certifications for farming, and trade are eligible. Medical recommendation must be given by a doctor, and provided by a certified entity.

cannabis

Production
The production of hashish was prohibited in Lebanon in 1926,during the era of the French Mandate for Syria and the Lebanon. However, the cannabis industry blossomed during the chaos of the 15-year Lebanese civil war (1975–1990).

The cultivation of cannabis itself was forbidden in 1992, under pressure from the United States.

By 2001, poverty had pressed many farmers to return to growing cannabis. By 2002, production had reached 37,000 acres: double what it was the year prior. Later on, cannabis farms flourished during the Syrian civil war starting from 2011, as the government was more concerned about security issues.

Legal status
In 2018, the Parliament speaker Nabih Berri stated, "The Lebanese Parliament is preparing to study and adopt the legislation necessary to legislate the cultivation of cannabis and its manufacture for medical uses in the manner of many European countries and some US states", as he told US Ambassador to Lebanon Elizabeth Richard according to Lebanon's official news agency. This announcement came after the release of a five-year study by McKinsey & Company to boost economic development. With the world's third highest debt, proponents for legalization argued that fostering the marijuana industry could help to reform the country's economy. Some growers that oppose the reform, such as Abu Jafaar of the Bekka Valley (Lebanon's most well known growing area), feared that government intervention will take revenue away from them and into the hands of politicians.

On 21 April 2020, the Parliament passed a law legalizing cannabis cultivation for medical use. Lebanon became the first Arab country to do so. Cultivation of non-psychoactive hemp was also made legal.

References

Lebanon
Society of Lebanon
Politics of Lebanon

Drugs in Lebanon